The Ohio Valley Siouan, or Southeastern Siouan, languages are a subfamily of the Western Siouan languages, far to the east and south of the Mississippi River. The group has Ofo and Biloxi, in the Lower Mississippi River valley, and Tutelo, historically spoken in Virginia, near the territory of the Catawban languages. All of the languages are now extinct.

They are called "Ohio Valley Siouan" languages because of a speculative origin along the Ohio River, but only the Tutelo and the Saponi historically dwelled near there. They possibly migrated to the Roanoke River from the region of the Big Sandy River just prior to European contact. The Biloxi and the Ofo lived far to the south, along the Mississippi River.

Charles F. Voegelin established, on the basis of linguistic evidence, that Catawban was very divergent from the other Siouan languages (only a minor fraction of the lexicon is obviously cognate, and it uses difficult-to-recognize personal pronouns and favors suppletion). However, Voegelin argued that "not only Biloxi and Ofo but also Tutelo form one group which I propose to call Ohio Valley Siouan. The implication that this group dispersed from the Ohio River Valley (the Tutelo moving east, the Biloxi and Ofo moving south) goes one step beyond Swanton's inference that the Ofo can be identified with the Mosopelea of the Ohio: it places the Biloxi and Tutelo in the Ohio Valley at the time when the Ofo were known as the Mosopelea, or just prior to that time."

References

Western Siouan languages